The 1802 State of the Union Address was written by Thomas Jefferson, the third president of the United States, on Wednesday, December 15, 1802.  He said, "When we assemble together, fellow citizens, to consider the state of our beloved country, our just attentions are first drawn to those pleasing circumstances which mark the goodness of that Being from whose favor they flow and the large measure of thankfulness we owe for His bounty. Another year has come around, and finds us still blessed with peace and friendship abroad; law, order, and religion at home; good affection and harmony with our Indian neighbors; our burthens lightened, yet our income sufficient for the public wants, and the produce of the year great beyond example."

References

State of the Union addresses
Presidency of Thomas Jefferson
State of the Union Address
Works by Thomas Jefferson
State of the Union Address
State of the Union Address
State of the Union Address
7th United States Congress
December 1802 events
State of the Union